The Rungra Bridge is a bridge in Pyongyang, North Korea, one of the city's six bridges on the Taedong River. Located between the Okryu Bridge to the south and Chongryu Bridge to the north, it connects Moranbong-guyok on the right (west) bank of the Taedong River with Taedonggang-guyok on the left bank, passing through Rungra Island in the middle. It totals  in length. It was completed in 1988.

References

Bridges in North Korea
Buildings and structures in Pyongyang
Bridges completed in 1988
1988 establishments in North Korea
20th-century architecture in North Korea